District 23 of the Oregon State Senate comprises parts of Portland and the entirety of Maywood Park. It is currently represented by Democrat Michael Dembrow of Portland.

Election results
District boundaries have changed over time, therefore, senators before 2013 may not represent the same constituency as today. From 1993 until 2003, the district covered parts of Southern Oregon, and from 2003 until 2013 it covered a slightly different area in Portland.

References

23
Multnomah County, Oregon